The 2007 Crystal Skate of Romania was the 8th edition of an annual senior-level international figure skating competition held in Romania. It was held between November 15 and 17, 2007 in Galați. Skaters competed in the disciplines of men's singles and ladies' singles.

Results

Men

Ladies

External links
 results

Crystal Skate Of Romania, 2007